Tung Wah Group of Hospitals Chang Ming Thien College is a secondary school located at No. 300, Nam Cheong Street, Kowloon, Hong Kong.

Overview 
The school was founded in 1971, the third offered by full-time government-funded grammar school of the Tung Wah Group of Hospitals. It uses Chinese as the medium of instruction. The campus covers an area of 7,400 square meters, a total of 32 classrooms, 16 special rooms, and a student activity center, the Language Self-Access Learning Centre, a large multi-purpose venue, study room, and library. All of the classrooms, special rooms are equipped with air-conditioning, a projector and computer equipment. The school consists of 60 teachers with a diploma in education, bachelor's or master's degree.

Society and extra-curricular activities 
Students Union, Sports Associations, four clubs and 28 Student Clubs will be selected each year to learn the composition of Executive Committee, to provide students with a wide range of extracurricular activities. Events include a Sports Day, Drama festival, Music festival, English and Chinese Week, and variety shows.

School curriculum
The school consists of 31 classes, with nearly 1,200 boys and girls. There is a diverse curriculum, including arts, science, business, technical, and practical subjects. There are four groups of 30 subjects, giving a variety of choices. Over the past few years, students have successfully participated in the HKCEE, HKALE, and other public examinations.

Gallery

See also
 Tung Wah Group of Hospitals

References

External links
 T.W.G.Hs Chang Ming Thien College
 Tung Wah Group of Hospitals

Educational institutions established in 1971
Secondary schools in Hong Kong
Sham Shui Po
Shek Kip Mei